The GUS Band is a world-famous brass band, based in Kettering, England.  Originally known as the Munn and Felton Works Band, it was formed by Fred Felton in 1933 in Kettering, England.  Since then, the band has won many prizes and competitions over the years.

History
On 2 January 1933, the Northamptonshire Evening Telegraph reported the formation of the 'Munn and Felton Works Brass Band'.  In that article, Mr Fred Felton, co-managing director of the firm, said: "We are out to make it the finest combination in the country, and to make it a contesting band of note throughout the country".  Two years later the new band were champions of Great Britain.  Since then, under the names of Munn and Felton, GUS (Footwear), The GUS Band, Rigid Containers Group Band, Travelsphere Holidays Band and now the Virtuosi GUS Band, the band has travelled Britain, Europe and America, appearing in concert halls, on television and radio, and has released many records and CDs.

Major honours
The band's contesting successes include winning 1 World Championship, 6 British National Championships, 2 British Open Championships, and 15 Midlands Championship titles.

Musical directors
The following list of resident and guest conductors is compiled from past contest results.

Partial discography
The band has released over 50 albums, a selection of which are listed here:
 Christmas Fantasia - The Music of Andrew Wainwright
 Freeh-Way
 A Mingled Chime
 Bandology
 British Bandstand
 Bandstand (volumes 1 to 10)
 Brass in Perspective
 Celebration Golden Jubilee
 European Journey
 In a Tribute to Eric Ball
 Journeys in Brass
 Kings of Brass
 Rhapsody in Blue - with Don Lusher OBE Soloist
 Travelling Light
 The World Champions Play Test Pieces for Brass
 English Landscapes
 Around the World in Eighty Minutes

References

External links
 Official website
 Spotlight on GUS

British brass bands
British instrumental musical groups
1933 in music
Musical groups established in 1933